Alone is a 2004 German drama film directed by Thomas Durchschlag. The film premiered at the 2004 Hof International Film Festival.

Cast 
 Lavinia Wilson – Maria
 Maximilian Brückner – Jan
 Richy Müller – Wolfgang
 Victoria Mayer – Sarah
  – Nico
  – Rasmus
  – Yuppie

References

External links 

2004 films
2004 drama films
German drama films
2000s German films